The 1979–80 season was Manchester United's 78th season in the Football League, and their fifth consecutive season in the top division of English football. They finished the season second in the league, just two points behind champions Liverpool, and qualified for the 1980–81 UEFA Cup. It was the first season at the club for new midfielder Ray Wilkins, signed in the 1979 close season for a club record fee of £750,000. However, United had gained a reputation for playing relatively dull football under Sexton after the more entertaining style of play under Tommy Docherty, and by the end of his third season as manager they had still yet to win a major trophy, as Liverpool won a fifth title in eight seasons.

On 25 February 1980 United's chairman since 1965, Louis Edwards died suddenly and unexpectedly of a heart attack. His son Martin Edwards replaced him as chairman on 22 March 1980.

First Division

FA Cup

League Cup

Squad statistics

References

Manchester United F.C. seasons
Manchester United